Tetramolopium is a genus of plants in the tribe Astereae within the family Asteraceae.

Most of the species are native to New Guinea, 11 species are found in Hawaii, and one in the Cook Islands, with the island populations apparently representing a recent (by evolutionary standards) colonization.  It is related to Camptacra, Kippistia, Minuria, Peripleura, and Vittadinia all of which are from Australia, New Guinea, New Zealand, or Pacific islands.

 Species

 formerly included
see Diplostephium 
 Tetramolopium ochraceum - Diplostephium ochraceum  
 Tetramolopium phylicoides  - Diplostephium phylicoides  
 Tetramolopium rupestre  - Diplostephium rupestre

References

External links 
 Plants of Hawaii has photos of several species

Asteraceae genera
 
Flora of the Pacific